Emblema may mean:

 Emblema (motif), a central motif in a panel in a Greek or Roman mosaic
 Emblema (bird), a genus of finches